2311 El Leoncito, provisional designation , is a dark and reddish asteroid from the outer region of the asteroid belt, approximately 53 kilometers in diameter. The asteroid was discovered by astronomers at Félix Aguilar Observatory at the Leoncito Astronomical Complex in Argentina on 10 October 1974. It was later named after the discovering site.

Orbit and classification 

El Leoncito orbits the Sun in the outer main-belt at a distance of 3.5–3.8 AU once every 6 years and 11 months (2,533 days). Its orbit has an eccentricity of 0.04 and an inclination of 7° with respect to the ecliptic.

It has a well-observed orbit with the lowest possible uncertainty – a condition code of 0 – and an observation arc that spans over a period of almost half a century, using precovery images on photographic plates from 1972.

Physical characteristics 

El Leoncito is characterized as a D-type asteroid in the Tholen taxonomy, one of only 46 known asteroids of this spectral type.

The body has a low albedo of 0.04, typical for D-type asteroids. Its rotation period, however, remains unknown.

Naming 

This minor planet derives its name from the Spanish name of the discovering astronomical complex of observatories, the Complejo Astronómico El Leoncito (CASLEO). The official naming citation was published by the Minor Planet Center on 22 September 1983.

References

External links 
 Asteroid Lightcurve Database (LCDB), query form (info )
 Dictionary of Minor Planet Names, Google books
 Asteroids and comets rotation curves, CdR – Observatoire de Genève, Raoul Behrend
 Discovery Circumstances: Numbered Minor Planets (1)-(5000) – Minor Planet Center
 
 

002311
002311
002311
Named minor planets
002311
19741010